The 2019 Pacific FC season was the first in the club's history, as well as first season in Canadian Premier League history.

Current squad
As of October 19, 2019.

Transfers

In

Loans in

Draft picks 
Pacific FC selected the following players in the 2018 CPL–U Sports Draft on November 12, 2018. Draft picks are not automatically signed to the team roster. Only those who are signed to a contract will be listed as transfers in.

Competitions 
Match times are Pacific Daylight Time (UTC−7).

Preseason

Canadian Premier League

Spring season

League table

Results summary

Results by match

Matches

Fall season

League table

Results summary

Results by match

Matches

Canadian Championship

Statistics

Squad and statistics 

|-
  

  

   

 
 
 
   
 
 

     
 
    

  
 
|}

Top scorers 
{| class="wikitable sortable alternance"  style="font-size:85%; text-align:center; line-height:14px; width:85%;"
|-
!width=10|Rank
!width=10|Nat.
! scope="col" style="width:275px;"|Player
!width=10|Pos.
!width=80|CPL Spring season
!width=80|CPL Fall season
!width=80|Canadian Championship
!width=80|TOTAL
|-
|1|||| Terran Campbell        || FW || 2 || 9 || 0 ||11
|-
|rowspan=2|2|||| Víctor Blasco        || MF || 3 || 3 || 0 ||6
|-
||| Ben Fisk        || MF || 1 || 5 || 0 ||6
|-
|4|||| Marcus Haber        || FW || 1 || 2 || 1 ||4
|-
|rowspan=2|5|||| Lukas MacNaughton        || DF || 0 || 2 || 0 ||2
|-
||| Zach Verhoven        || MF || 0 || 2 || 0 ||2
|-
|rowspan=5|7|||| Ahmed Alghamdi        || MF || 1 || 0 || 0 ||1
|-
||| Kadin Chung        || DF || 0 || 1 || 0 ||1
|-
||| José Hernández        || FW || 1 || 0 || 0 ||1
|-
||| Issey Nakajima-Farran        || MF || 1 || 0 || 0 ||1
|-
||| Hendrik Starostzik        || DF || 1 || 0 || 0 ||1
|-
|- class="sortbottom"
| colspan="4"|Totals||11||24||1||36

Top assists 
{| class="wikitable sortable alternance"  style="font-size:85%; text-align:center; line-height:14px; width:85%;"
|-
!width=10|Rank
!width=10|Nat.
! scope="col" style="width:275px;"|Player
!width=10|Pos.
!width=80|CPL Spring season
!width=80|CPL Fall season
!width=80|Canadian Championship
!width=80|TOTAL
|-
|1|||| Blake Smith        || DF || 1 || 4 || 0 ||5
|-
|2|||| Ben Fisk        || MF || 2 || 2 || 0 ||4
|-
|rowspan=2|3|||| Víctor Blasco        || MF || 0 || 3 || 0 ||3
|-
||| Terran Campbell        || FW || 1 || 1 || 1 ||3
|-
|rowspan=4|5|||| Kadin Chung        || DF || 1 || 1 || 0 ||2
|-
||| José Hernández        || FW || 1 || 1 || 0 ||2
|-
||| Alexander González   || MF || 0 || 2 || 0 ||2
|-
||| Zach Verhoven        || MF || 0 || 2 || 0 ||2
|-
|9|||| Noah Verhoeven        || MF || 1 || 0 || 0 ||1
|-
|- class="sortbottom"
| colspan="4"|Totals||7||16||1||24

Clean sheets 
{| class="wikitable sortable alternance"  style="font-size:85%; text-align:center; line-height:14px; width:85%;"
|-
!width=10|Rank
!width=10|Nat.
! scope="col" style="width:275px;"|Player
!width=80|CPL Spring season
!width=80|CPL Fall season
!width=80|Canadian Championship
!width=80|TOTAL
|-
|1|||| Mark Village        || 2 || 2 || 0 ||4
|-
|2|||| Nolan Wirth        || 0 || 1 || 0 ||1
|-
|- class="sortbottom"
| colspan="3"|Totals||2||3||0||5

Disciplinary record 
{| class="wikitable sortable alternance"  style="font-size:85%; text-align:center; line-height:14px; width:85%;"
|-
!rowspan="2" width=10|No.
!rowspan="2" width=10|Pos.
!rowspan="2" width=10|Nat.
!rowspan="2" scope="col" style="width:275px;"|Player
!colspan="2" width=80|CPL Spring season
!colspan="2" width=80|CPL Fall season
!colspan="2" width=80|Canadian Championship
!colspan="2" width=80|TOTAL
|-
! !!  !!  !!  !!  !!  !!  !! 
|-
|3||DF|||| Ryan McCurdy    ||1||0||0||1||0||0||1||1
|-
|4||DF|||| Blake Smith    ||1||0||2||0||0||0||3||0
|-
|5||DF|||| Hendrik Starostzik    ||0||0||3||0||0||0||3||0
|-
|6||DF|||| Lukas MacNaughton    ||0||1||2||0||0||0||2||1
|-
|7||DF|||| Kadin Chung    ||0||0||2||0||0||0||2||0
|-
|8||MF|||| Matthew Baldisimo    ||3||0||2||1||1||0||6||1
|-
|9||FW|||| Marcus Haber    ||0||0||0||0||1||0||1||0
|-
|10||MF|||| Ben Fisk    ||0||0||1||0||0||0||1||0
|-
|11||MF|||| Issey Nakajima-Farran    ||0||0||1||0||1||0||2||0
|-
|13||MF|||| Ahmed Alghamdi    ||1||0||0||0||0||0||1||0
|-
|15||FW|||| José Hernández    ||0||0||2||0||0||0||2||0
|-
|16||MF|||| Zach Verhoven    ||0||0||1||0||1||0||2||0
|-
|19||MF|||| Noah Verhoeven    ||1||0||1||0||0||0||2||0
|-
|20||DF|||| Émile Legault    ||1||0||2||0||0||0||3||0
|-
|21||MF|||| Alessandro Hojabrpour    ||1||0||3||0||0||0||4||0
|-
|23||MF|||| Víctor Blasco    ||1||0||3||0||0||0||4||0
|-
|24||MF|||| David Norman Jr.    ||0||0||2||0||0||0||2||0
|-
|26||GK|||| Mark Village    ||1||0||0||0||0||0||1||0
|-
|28||MF|||| Alexander González    ||2||1||1||0||0||0||3||1
|-
|- class="sortbottom"
| colspan="4"|Totals||13||2||28||2||4||0||45||4

References

External links 
2019 Pacific FC season at Official Site

Pacific FC seasons
Pacific FC
PAC
Pacific FC